A purely combinatorial approach to mirror symmetry was suggested by Victor Batyrev using the polar duality for -dimensional convex polyhedra.  The most famous examples of the polar duality provide Platonic solids: e.g., the cube is dual to octahedron, the dodecahedron is dual to icosahedron.  There is a natural bijection between the -dimensional faces of a -dimensional convex polyhedron  and -dimensional faces of the dual polyhedron  and one has  . In Batyrev's  combinatorial approach to  mirror symmetry the polar duality is applied to  special -dimensional convex lattice polytopes which are called reflexive polytopes.

It was observed by Victor Batyrev and Duco van Straten that the method of Philip Candelas et al.  for computing the number of rational curves on Calabi–Yau quintic 3-folds  can be applied to arbitrary Calabi–Yau complete intersections using the generalized -hypergeometric functions introduced by Israel Gelfand, Michail Kapranov and Andrei Zelevinsky (see also the talk of Alexander Varchenko), where  is the set of lattice points in a reflexive polytope .

The combinatorial mirror duality for Calabi–Yau hypersurfaces in toric varieties has been generalized by Lev Borisov  in the case of Calabi–Yau complete intersections in Gorenstein toric Fano varieties. Using the notions of dual cone and polar cone one can consider the polar duality for reflexive polytopes as a special case of the duality  for convex Gorenstein cones  and of the duality for Gorenstein polytopes.

For any  fixed natural number   there exists only a finite number  of -dimensional reflexive polytopes up to a -isomorphism. The number 
-dimensional reflexive simplices up to a -isomorphism is closely related to the enumeration of all solutions  of the diophantine equation .  The classification of 4-dimensional reflexive polytopes up to a -isomorphism is important  for constructing many topologically different 3-dimensional Calabi–Yau manifolds using hypersurfaces in 4-dimensional toric varieties which are Gorenstein Fano varieties. The complete list of 3-dimensional and 4-dimensional reflexive polytopes have been obtained by 
physicists Maximilian Kreuzer and  Harald Skarke using a special software in Polymake.

A mathematical explanation of the combinatorial mirror symmetry has been obtained by Lev Borisov via vertex operator algebras which are algebraic counterparts of 
conformal field theories.

See also
 Toric variety
 Homological mirror symmetry
 Mirror symmetry (string theory)

References 

Algebraic geometry
Mathematical physics
Duality theories
String theory